V. Pudur (Vilathikulam Pudur) is a panchayat town in Thoothukudi district in the Indian state of Tamil Nadu.

Demographics
 India census, V. Pudur had a population of 8037. Males constitute 50% of the population and females 50%. V. Pudur has an average literacy rate of 69%, higher than the national average of 59.5%: male literacy is 78%, and female literacy is 59%. In V. Pudur, 11% of the population is under 6 years of age.

Economy

Pudur serves as town for the nearby villages and fulfills the needs of the people such as Education, Medical and Agricultural Business. Economy of this town is fully dependent on agriculture and agriculture-based activities. Some popular match industries such as the Century Match Factory in Pudur and the two spinning mills(JAGATHAMBIKA AND VIJAYALAKSHMI) Own by jayavilass Group, situated near Pudur provides employment opportunities for a sound number of people living here.

Commercial areas of this town include the Anna Salai, Kadalkudi Road and Gandhi Bazaar. Out of these Anna Salai that runs through the town enclose most of the shops and commercial complexes Such as Alagammal Super Market.
Kadalkudi road situated in the east of the town is developing since 2000 that too holds a large number commercial buildings. Gandhi Bazaar was once a popular and busy business area but since the past few years most of the shops were evacuated and moved to Anna Salai and Kadalkudi Road.

Medical Facilities

This town has good Govt. Primary Health Center situated in the Vilathukulam road that serves for poor and needy people. Also there are private Doctors in this town Dr. sathrapathy MBBS, Dr. Thirumal Murugan, Dr.A.Jeyalakshmi Lingaiah D.H.M.S.,Dr. Suba Barathi BDS, are well known for their service.

Agriculture

This is a manavari land (land depending on rain). Farmers cultivate their land in rainy season only. Dry Chilly is one of the major agricultural product grown in this region. Kambu, Cholam are also cultivated in large area.

Transport

Pudhur lies on the Arupukottai - Vilathikulam main road and hence served by frequent bus services. The major Towns situated nearby Pudur are Vilathikulam (19 km), Arupukottai (22 km), Sattur (28 km), Kovilpatti (45 km) and Madurai (75 km).

There are direct and frequent bus services from Pudur to Kovilpatti, Thoothukudi, Aruppukottai and Sattur.

Private cabs (Mini bus, Van and Cars) are also available.

Financial

There are well established banks in this town which are the:

Tamil Nadu State Co-Operative Bank
Pandian Grama Bank
Thoothukudi District Co-operative bank
Tamil Nadu Mercantile Bank (TMB)

An ATM is operated by TMB and the ATM is available in the bank premises in the Anna Salai.

Entertainment

Until a few years ago there were two talkies at pudur named Seetharamu in the Arupukkottai Road and Rathna in the Vadakkunatham road. Both of these theatres were the entertainment spots to the people in pudur and near by villages for more than 2 decades. Both of them were closed and demolished now due to less public interest.

Education

Education is not a burden for the children of Pudur. Well established schools are there in Pudur to educate children. Service is done by

Govt Higher Secondary School
Hindu Nadar High School
Panchayat Union Middle School
T.D.T.A Primary School
Sri Krishna Nursery and Primary School
Government School Kumarachithanpatti 
Mahathma Matriculation School

Also Maharajapuram Seeni Matriculation School at Nagalapuram (the nearby village) Serves with English Medium of Learning.

Politics

Pudur Comes under the Assembly constituency of Vilathikulam and LokSabha constituency of Thoothukudi. Formerly it was in Thirunelveli LokSabha constituency.

Pudur is basically a calm town where there is no communal violence or other major crimes registered in the past 30 years.

References

Cities and towns in Thoothukudi district